The Naomi Mine explosion occurred on December 1, 1907, in the Naomi Mine, approximately  from Fayette City, Pennsylvania. The incident resulted in the deaths of at least 35 miners and left no survivors.

Naomi Mine
The Naomi Mine was operated by Hillman Coal and Coke Company. It was situated east of the Monongahela River. Coal was hauled out of the mine with carts that were equipped with electric motors.

From 1870 (the earliest year records were kept) to December 1, 1907 (the day the mine closed), a total of 63 men were killed in the Naomi Mine.

Events and aftermath
The explosion happened at about 7:15 on the night of Sunday, December 1, 1907. Inadequate ventilation allowed pockets of explosive gas to accumulate in the interior of the mine. The gas was most likely ignited by an open light or electric arc, both of which would have been present at the time.

Several miners who lost their jobs in the closing of the Naomi Mine would soon find work in the Darr Mine located in nearby Westmoreland County, Pennsylvania. On December 19, 1907, many of these displaced miners would be killed in the Darr Mine Disaster, the deadliest coal mining disaster in Pennsylvania history.

References

External links 
 Naomi Mine: A Tribute to the Coal Miners that mined the Bituminous Coal seams of the Naomi Mine, Fayette County, Pennsylvania, U.S.A.
 Darr Mine Disaster from the Fayette County Cultural Trust
 Why Do Coal Mines Explode?

1907 mining disasters
Coal mining disasters in Pennsylvania
Fayette County, Pennsylvania
Underground mines in the United States
1907 in Pennsylvania
1907 disasters in the United States
Disasters in Pennsylvania